Farida Jalal is a film actress in the Northern Nigerian film industry known as Kannywood.

Early life and education 
Farida Jallal was born on November 2, 1985 in Katsina, Katsina State. Farida grew up and studied in her home state of Katsina where she later moved to Kano State and start her career in the film industry at the Kannywood Hausa film industry.

Career 
Farida entered the film industry in 2002 where she appeared in major industry films of the time such as Yakana, Sansani and Madadi.  Actress Farida Jallal has been banned from filming for some times due to the banning of some film actress from filming by Kano State government. In 2019, Farida har appears in Kannywood again. At that time, she announced that she was back in the film industry and even announced that she would be releasing her films soon.  In an interview with BBC Hausa, Farida revealed that she's still being exploited in the Kannywood industry. In an interview, actress Farida Jallal stated that she is currently focusing on Islamic Gospel Musics.

Personal life 
Farida married and had two children, but one of her children died.  Farida is currently single.

References 

1985 births
Living people
Hausa people
People from Katsina State
Nigerian film actresses
Actresses in Hausa cinema